Waterfall railway station was the first intermediate stop on the Snowdon Mountain Railway, located on the southern edge of  Llanberis, Gwynedd, Wales.

History
Waterfall railway station was built to allow visitors to use the train to travel to a spectacular waterfall close to the line. A short distance from Waterfall station is a bridge over the river and a gate, which marks the start of the mountain.

The station opened with the railway on 6 April 1896, but both closed the same day following an accident. They reopened on 9 April 1897 without mishap. Except for wartime, the station operated until closure in September 1923. The line through the station remains operational.

Location

Facilities
The station is closed to passengers, but the station building remains in use as an engineers' base. The original station had one platform, which was demolished after closure. During the latter part of 2016 Snowdon Mountain Railway engineers constructed two new platforms at Waterfall station, one on each side of the main running line.

References

Sources

External links

 The line and its stations, via Snowdon Mountain Railway
 Edwardian 6" map showing the station, overlain with modern satellite images and maps, via National Library of Scotland
 The station and line, via Rail Map Online
 Images of the station, waterfall and line, via Yahoo

Railway stations in Great Britain opened in 1896
Llanberis
Heritage railway stations in Gwynedd